Astrotischeria ambrosiaeella is a moth of the family Tischeriidae. It was described by Vactor Tousey Chambers in 1875. It is found in North America, including California, Florida, Louisiana, Ohio and Texas.

The larvae feed on Ambrosia trifida. They mine the leaves of their host plant.

References

Moths described in 1875
Tischeriidae